Orlich may refer to:

Francisco Orlich Bolmarcich (1907–1969), 34th President of Costa Rica (1962–1966)
Dan Orlich (1924–2019), American football player
Don Orlich, professor emeritus at Washington State University
Sam L. Orlich, former member of the Wisconsin State Assembly

See also
Orlich Gniazd (Eagles' Nests Landscape Park) in south-western Poland
Szlak Orlich Gniazd (Trail of the Eagle's Nests) south-western Poland